Voice parts may refer to:

 Voice type - soprano, baritone, etc.
 Voice acting jobs